Mount Gran is a large flat-topped mountain,  high, standing at the north side of Mackay Glacier and immediately west of Gran Glacier in Victoria Land, Antarctica. It was discovered by the British Antarctic Expedition, 1910–13, which named it for Tryggve Gran, a Norwegian naval officer who was a ski expert with the expedition.

References

Mountains of Victoria Land
Scott Coast